Joseph Régis Jocelyn Thibault (born January 12, 1975) is a Canadian former professional ice hockey goaltender who played 14 seasons in the National Hockey League (NHL) for the Quebec Nordiques, Colorado Avalanche, Montreal Canadiens, Chicago Blackhawks, Pittsburgh Penguins, and Buffalo Sabres. Thibault was born in Montreal, Quebec and grew up in nearby Laval.

He led a group out of Sherbrooke, Quebec to create an expansion team in the QMJHL. The new team, Sherbrooke Phoenix, started playing in the 2012–13 season. In 2021, Thibault left the Phoenix to become the new executive director of Hockey Quebec.

Playing career
As a youth, Thibault played in the 1988 Quebec International Pee-Wee Hockey Tournament with a minor ice hockey team from Laval, Quebec. He played in the Quebec Major Junior Hockey League as part of the Trois-Rivières Draveurs and Sherbrooke Faucons.

Thibault was drafted by the Quebec Nordiques 10th overall in the 1993 NHL Entry Draft. He went on to play for the Nordiques, staying for a short time after they moved to Denver and became the Colorado Avalanche. In 1995, midway through the Avalanche's first season in Denver, he was sent to the Montreal Canadiens in a trade that moved Patrick Roy to the Avalanche. Thibault played three seasons with the Canadiens before being traded to the Chicago Blackhawks in November 1998.

Thibault played longer with the Blackhawks than with any other team—five seasons. His best season was the 2002–03 season when he recorded eight shutouts and made an appearance in the 2003 NHL All-Star Game. He recorded his career best GAA of 2.37 and a save percentage of .915. The following season had him suffer a torn labrum in November, requiring surgery and having Michael Leighton replace him.

After the lockout, Thibault was acquired by the Pittsburgh Penguins in August 2005, for a fourth round pick in the 2006 NHL Entry Draft on a two-year contract worth $3 million. However, a hip injury contributed to a bad beginning, with the veteran losing 12 of 13 starts. He was replaced as the starter by Marc-André Fleury in late November and put on waivers. In January 2006, he underwent surgery to repair torn cartilage in his left hip.

Thibault was signed as an unrestricted free agent on July 5, 2007, by the Buffalo Sabres. He played one season with Buffalo as the backup to Ryan Miller and was not re-signed.

Thibault has the distinction of being the winning goaltender of the last game at the Montreal Forum, Maple Leaf Gardens, and the Capital Centre. He also played in the last game at Colisee de Quebec.

Personal
Thibault and his wife Melanie have three daughters. The family resides in Sherbrooke, Quebec.

Thibault is the godfather of current Pittsburgh Penguins prospect Samuel Poulin.

Career statistics

Regular season and playoffs

Transactions
 June 26, 1993 – Drafted by the Quebec Nordiques in the first round (10th overall) in 1993 draft.
 June 21, 1995 – Rights transferred to the Colorado Avalanche after the Nordiques franchise relocated.
 December 6, 1995 – Montreal Canadiens traded Patrick Roy and Mike Keane to the Avalanche for Andrei Kovalenko, Martin Ručínský, and Thibault.
November 16, 1998 – Chicago Blackhawks traded Jeff Hackett, Eric Weinrich, Alain Nasreddine, and fourth-round selection (previously acquired from the Tampa Bay Lightning – Chris Dyment) in 1999 draft to the Canadiens for Thibault, Dave Manson, and Brad Brown.
 August 10, 2005 – Traded to the Pittsburgh Penguins for a fourth-round selection in 2006 draft.
July 5, 2007 – Signed as an unrestricted free agent by the Buffalo Sabres.

References

External links

1975 births
Living people
Buffalo Sabres players
Canadian ice hockey goaltenders
Chicago Blackhawks players
Colorado Avalanche coaches
Colorado Avalanche players
Cornwall Aces players
French Quebecers
Ice hockey people from Montreal
Montreal Canadiens players
National Hockey League All-Stars
National Hockey League first-round draft picks
Pittsburgh Penguins players
Quebec Nordiques draft picks
Quebec Nordiques players
Sherbrooke Faucons players
Sportspeople from Laval, Quebec
Trois-Rivières Draveurs players
Canadian ice hockey coaches